Bayannuur (Mongolian: rich lake) is a sum (district) of the Bayan-Ölgii Aimag (province) in Mongolia. It is located to the very east of the aimag capital Ölgii and it has a border with the Uvs Aimag. Like in Bayan-Ölgii's other sums, Bayannuur is primarily inhabited by ethnic Kazakhs.
As of 2014 it had a population of 4794 people.

References

Populated places in Mongolia
Districts of Bayan-Ölgii Province